Thomas McArthur or MacArthur may refer to:

Tom MacArthur (born 1960), American businessman and politician
Tom McArthur (umpire) (1937–2018), Australian rules football umpire in Queensland
Tom McArthur (linguist), editor of English Today